The 2004 Thailand Open was a men's tennis tournament played on indoor hard courts. It was the 2nd edition of the Thailand Open, and was part of the International Series of the 2004 ATP Tour. It took place at the Impact Arena in Bangkok, Thailand, from 27 September through 3 October 2004. Roger Federer won the singles title.

Finals

Singles

 Roger Federer defeated  Andy Roddick, 6–4, 6–0
It was Roger Federer's 10th title of the year, also his 21st overall.

Doubles

 Justin Gimelstob /  Graydon Oliver defeated  Yves Allegro /  Roger Federer, 5–7, 6–4, 6–4

References

External links
Thailand Open on the official Association of Tennis Professionals website

 
 ATP Tour
 in tennis
Tennis, ATP Tour, Thailand Open
Tennis, ATP Tour, Thailand Open

Tennis, ATP Tour, Thailand Open
Tennis, ATP Tour, Thailand Open